Ilir Duro (born 25 July 1966) is a retired Albanian footballer who played during his career as forward for Besa Kavajë, Dinamo Tirana and Freiburger FC. He served as head coach of Besa Kavajë in the Albanian Superliga and the Albania national under-19 football team

Managerial career
He left Egnatia Rrogozhinë in January 2019.

References

1966 births
Living people
Footballers from Kavajë
Albanian footballers
Association football forwards
Besa Kavajë players
Albanian expatriate footballers
Expatriate footballers in Germany
Albanian expatriate sportspeople in Germany
Albanian football managers
Besa Kavajë managers
Freiburger FC players